The list of Tetragrammatons in art in Austria includes tetragrammatons found in Austrian art. Since the 16th century, artists have been using the tetragrammaton as a symbol for God, or for divine illumination. Since the 17th century, the tetragrammaton was inscribed on top of altars, or in center of frescos, often in rays of light or in a triangle. Moreover, on illustrations of Jewish High Priests (like Aaron) or Jewish Priests (like Zechariah), the tetragrammaton was used to illustrate the Priestly golden head plate. In the time of Nazism, efforts to eliminate alleged Jewish influence included to remove tetragrammatons.

The following list includes objects as buildings, frescos, altars, paintings, monuments and grave constructions in Austria still featuring the biblical name of God יהוה‎ in Hebrew characters. The list does not include longer Hebrew text passages containing the name of God. By default, the list is sorted according to states of Austria, and to municipalities, in alphabetical order. If not otherwise mentioned, the listed church buildings are Catholic Churches.

The following objects contain Hebrew or Pseudo-Hebrew characters on positions where an observer would anticipate to find the Tetragrammaton, but the spelling does not even resemble the Tetragrammaton יהוה in appearance:

Literature 
 Wolfgang and Carmen Kriegler: Auf Spurensuche in Wien. Vienna, 3rd edition, 2016.
 Wolfgang Kriegler: Auf Spurensuche im Burgenland und in der Steiermark. Vienna, 2nd edition, 2018.
 Wolfgang Kriegler: Auf Spurensuche in Tirol und Vorarlberg. Vienna 2016.
 Wolfgang and Carmen Kriegler: Auf Spurensuche in Niederösterreich. Vienna 2017. 
 Wolfgang and Carmen Kriegler: Auf Spurensuche in Salzburg und Oberösterreich. Vienna 2017.
 (Günther Fontane) Der Name Gottes יהוה. Entdeckt in unserer Nähe. Kärnten & Osttirol. Gmünd in Kärnten 2013.
 יהוה. Der Name Gottes in hebräischen Schriftzeichen. Fundstellen im Öffentlichen Raum der Stadt Salzburg. Salzburg 2008.

References

Tetragrammaton
Austria-related lists
Cultural lists